Donald Lees Reid BA (Hons)  is a Scottish author. He specialises in local and social history and has written books on the history of the Garnock Valley and Doon Valley, including the towns of Beith, Barrmill, Dalmellington, Gateside, Kilbirnie, Patna, and Waterside. He has resided in Beith, North Ayrshire since 1986. A strong emphasis in the books is on the people and the social context of their lives.

Donald was born and brought up in Dalmellington, the son of James Reid, a miner for 43 years, and Mary Hose. He retired from the Strathclyde Police Force in 1999 with the rank of Police Superintendent. In 1994 he was accorded the honour of being selected as Beith Citizen of the Year for his voluntary work.

Authorship
 Reid, Donald L. (1994). Reflections of Beith and District – On the Wings of Time. Beith High Church Youth Group.
 Reid, Donald L. & Monahan, Isobel F. (1998). Yesterday's Beith. A Pictorial Guide. Beith : Duke of Edinburgh Award. .
 Reid, Donald L. (2000). The Beith Supplement – The Story of Beith's Newspaper. Beith : Duke of Edinburgh Award. .
 Reid, Donald L. (2001). In the Valley of the Garnock. Beith, Dalry & Kilbirnie. Beith : Duke of Edinburgh Award. .
 Reid, Donald L. (2001). Old Beith. Ochiltree : Stenlake Publishing. .
 Reid, Donald L. (2001). Old Dalmellington, Patna and Waterside. Ochiltree : Stenlake Publishing.
 Reid, Donald L. (2002). Doon Valley Memories. A Pictorial Reflection.
 Reid, Donald L. (2003). Barrmill Jolly Beggars Burns Club – Reflections on a Diamond Jubilee.
 Reid, Donald L. (2004). Doon Valley Bygones.
 Reid, Donald L. (2005). Yesterday's Patna & The Lost Villages of the Doon valley.
 Reid, Doanld L. (2005). Robert Burns' Valley of Doon – An Ayrshire Journey Down Memory Lane.
 Reid, Donald L. (2006). More Old Beith.
 Reid, Donald L. (2009). Discovering Matthew Anderson. Policeman-Poet of Ayrshire. Beith : Cleland Crosbie. .
 Reid, Donald L. (2010). Beith, Barrmill & Gateside. Precious memories. .
 Reid, Donald L. (2012). The Lost Mining Villages of Doon Valley. Voices and Images of Ayrshire. .

References

Sources
 Reid, Donald L. (2010). Beith, Barrmill & Gateside. Precious memories. .
 Reid, Donald L. (2009). Discovering Matthew Anderson. Policeman-Poet of Ayrshire. Beith : Cleland Crosbie. .

1951 births
Living people
Fellows of the Society of Antiquaries of Scotland